Members of the genus Lophius, also sometimes called monkfish, fishing-frogs, frog-fish, and sea-devils, are various species of lophiid anglerfishes found in the Atlantic and Indian Oceans. Lophius is known as the "monk" or "monkfish" to the North Sea and North Atlantic fishermen, a name which also belongs to Squatina squatina, the 
angelshark, a type of shark. The North European species is Lophius piscatorius, and the Mediterranean species is Lophius budegassa.

Species
The seven recognized extant species in this genus are:

Fossils
 †Lophius brachysomus Agassiz, 1835 (Monte Bolca, or Eocene anglerfish)

Description

The head is large, broad, flat, and depressed, with the remainder of the body appearing merely like an appendage. The wide mouth extends all around the anterior circumference of the head, and both jaws are armed with bands of long, pointed teeth, which are inclined inwards, and can be temporarily depressed to offer no impediment to an object gliding toward the stomach while still preventing its escape from the mouth. The pectoral and ventral fins are so articulated as to perform the functions of feet, the fish being enabled to walk on the bottom of the sea, where it generally hides in the sand or amongst the seaweed. All around its head and along the body, the skin bears fringed appendages resembling short fronds of seaweed. These structures, combined with the ability to change the colour of the body to match its surroundings, assist the fish greatly in concealing itself in its lurking places, which are selected for its abundance of prey. 

Species of Lophius have three long filaments sprouting from the middle of their heads; these are detached and modified three first spines of the anterior dorsal fin. As with all anglerfish species, the longest filament is the first, which terminates in an irregular growth of flesh, the esca (also referred to as the illicium), and is movable in all directions; this modified fin ray is used as a light to attract other fish, which the monkfish then seize with their enormous jaws, devouring them whole. Whether the prey has been attracted to the lure is not strictly relevant, as the action of the jaws is an automatic reflex triggered by contact with the esca.

Monkfish, like most anglerfish, are also characterised by an enormously distensible stomach, allowing an individual monkfish to swallow prey as large as itself.

Reproduction
The eggs in this sheet are in a single layer, each in its own little cavity. The spawn is free in the sea. The larvae are free-swimming and have pelvic fins with elongated filaments.

Habitat
The East Atlantic species is found along the coasts of Europe but becomes scarce beyond 60°N latitude; it also occurs on the coasts of the Cape of Good Hope. The species caught on the North American side of the Atlantic is usually Lophius americanus. A third species (Lophius budegassa), inhabits the Mediterranean, and a fourth (L. setigerus) the coasts of China and Japan.

These two species are very similar, with only a few distinctions between them. These include the colour of the peritoneum (black for L. budegassa and white for L. piscatorius) and the number of rays in the second dorsal fin (L. budegassa, 9–10 and L. piscatorius, 11–12). Also, minor differences in their distribution occur. Black anglerfish tend to have a more southern distribution (Mediterranean and eastern North Atlantic from the British Isles to Senegal). In contrast, the white anglerfish are distributed further north (Mediterranean, Black Sea and eastern North Atlantic from the Barents Sea to the Strait of Gibraltar). Despite these differences, the overall distribution of the black and white anglerfish tend to overlap greatly. A map of the distribution of anglerfish in the waters surrounding Europe and North Africa can be found in the external links section. The movements of both species of anglerfish indicate mixing of both northern and southern species could have strong implications for the geographical boundaries of the stocks from a management perspective. Both species of Lophius are important because they are commercially valuable species usually caught by trawl and gillnetting fleets.

Concern is expressed over the sustainability of monkfish fishing. The method most commonly used to catch monkfish, beam trawling, has been described as damaging to seafloor habitats. In February 2007, the British supermarket chain Asda banned monkfish from their stores.

References

External links
 
 Monkfish facts, Maryland Department of Natural Resources
 NOAA Monkfish Research Program
 Map of Anglerfish distribution

Further reads 

 Payne, J. F.., White, Dave., Coady, Jamie. Potential Effects of Seismic Airgun Discharges on Monkfish Eggs (Lophius Americanus) and Larvae. Canada: Environmental Studies Research Funds, 2009.
 Monkfish Fishery Regulations, Northeast Multispecies Fishery, Fishery Management Plan (FMP) Amendment 9, Exclusive Economic Zone (EEZ) Off the New England and Mid-Atlantic Coast: Environmental Impact Statement. United States: n.p., 1999.

 
Ray-finned fish genera
Commercial fish
Extant Lutetian first appearances
Marine fish genera
Taxa named by Carl Linnaeus
Lutetian genus first appearances